Muhammad Hammad Azhar is a Pakistani politician from Pakistan Tehreek-e-Insaf. He was elected from NA-126 (Lahore-IV) in 2018 Pakistani general election and remained a member of National Assembly of Pakistan between August 2018 to January 2023. He served in various ministerial positions in Imran Khan ministry between 2018 and April 2022. He served as Energy Minister of Pakistan and Finance Minister of Pakistan between 16 April 2021 to 3 April 2022 and 29 March 2021 to 16 April 2021 respectively.  

He also served as  Federal Minister for Economic Affairs (10 July 2019 to 5 April 2020), Federal Minister of Industries and Production (6 April 2020 to 6 March 2021),  Minister of State for Revenue  (11 September 2018 to 9 July 2019) and Federal Minister for Revenue  (8 July 2019 to 9 July 2019).

Early life and education
He was born to the former Governor of Punjab, Mian Muhammad Azhar, a political Arain Mian Family of Lahore.

He is a barrister by profession. He received his early education from Aitchison College and later was a pupil at Wellington College. He graduated with a bachelor's degree in Development Economics from the SOAS, University of London and  completed his postgraduate diploma in law from the BPP Law School. He enrolled for the Bar Vocational Course in 2004 and was formally called to the Bar at The Honorable Society of Lincoln’s Inn in 2005.

Political career
The World Economic Forum WEF named Minister for Economic Affairs Hammad Azhar as one of its Young Global Leaders from South Asia. According to a press release, the WEF identifies the world's most promising leaders under the age of 40 who are driving innovation for positive change across civil society, arts, culture, government and business. Azhar has been named alongside 114 young global leaders that make up the class of 2020. Pakistani journalist Atika Rehman is also among those selected from South Asia for the YGL 2020 intake.

Azhar joined Pakistan Tehreek-e-Insaf (PTI) in 2011.

He ran for the seat of the National Assembly of Pakistan as a candidate of PTI from Constituency NA-121 (Lahore-IV) in 2013 Pakistani general election but was unsuccessful. He received 68,307 votes and lost the seat to Mehr Ishtiaq Ahmed.

Azhar was elected to the National Assembly as a candidate of PTI from Constituency NA-126 (Lahore-IV) in 2018 Pakistani general election.

On 11 September 2018, Azhar was inducted into the federal cabinet of Prime Minister Imran Khan and was appointed Minister of State for Revenue.

On 11 June 2019, Hammad presented the 2019-20 annual budget of Pakistan in National Assembly of Pakistan.

On 8 July 2019, Azhar was elevated to the post of Federal Minister and was appointed Federal Minister for Revenue. The next day, he ceased to hold the office of federal minister for Revenue Division and was appointed the federal minister for Economic Affairs Division.

On 6 April 2020 he was removed from the position of Federal Minister for Economic Affairs, and was given the portfolio of Federal Minister for Industries and Production.

On 12 June 2020, Hammad presented the Rs. 7,294.9 billion 2020-21 annual 'Corona' budget of Pakistan in the National Assembly of Pakistan reflecting a reduction in its size by 11 percent from the budget estimates for fiscal 2019–20.

"Formulation and presentation of the budget in times of the coronavirus pandemic that besets the world at present and is on the ascent in Pakistan at the moment with total uncertainty about its descent is almost an impossible task, particularly for a developing country like Pakistan and therefore, the present budget can at best be viewed as 'work in progress' that would need a revision/tweaking as the economic fallout from the pandemic continues to unfold."

On 29 March 2021, after the removal of Abdul Hafeez Shaikh from Federal Cabinet, Azhar was given additional charge of Federal Minister for Finance and Revenue. 

On 17 April 2021, Shaukat Tareen was appointed Federal Minister for Finance and Revenue and Hammad Azhar was promoted as Federal Minister of Energy. This ministry is considered to be the most difficult due to rising circular debt and costly power agreements that require new negotiations.

Other activities
 Asian Development Bank (ADB), Ex-Officio Member of the Board of Governors (since 2018)
 Asian Infrastructure Investment Bank (AIIB), Ex-Officio Member of the Board of Governors (since 2018)
 Islamic Development Bank (IsDB), Ex-Officio Member of the Board of Governors (since 2018)

References

Living people
Pakistani MNAs 2018–2023
Pakistan Tehreek-e-Insaf MNAs
Pakistani barristers
Year of birth missing (living people)
Aitchison College alumni
Finance Ministers of Pakistan
Alumni of SOAS University of London